The Yokohama Specie Bank Building is a seven-story building in The Bund, Shanghai, China; previously it was a branch of Yokohama Specie Bank. It is now a branch of the Shanghai Textile Holding Corporation.

The building was designed by architects at P & T Architects & Engineers Ltd. The building was built on the site of David Sassoon's 1845 building. The Japanese bank purchased the site in 1920, began construction of the current building in 1923, and completed construction in 1924. After World War II the Chinese government confiscated the bank's assets, and the building became the headquarters of the Shanghai Textile Industry Bureau.

References

Bibliography
 Shea, Marilyn. "The Bund - Picture Guide to Historic Buildings". The University of Maine. 2007. Retrieved September 22, 2012.

External links
 Buildings of the Bund

Buildings and structures completed in 1924
Industrial and Commercial Bank of China
Buildings and structures in Shanghai
The Bund
China–Japan relations